Janam may refer to:
Janam (1985 film), a 1985 Hindi film
Janam (1993 film), a 1993 Indian Malayalam film
Jana Natya Manch ("People's Theatre Front"; Janam for short), a New Delhi-based amateur theatre company
Janam TV, an Indian television channel

See also
Janam Kundli, a 1995 Indian Bollywood film 
Janam Se Pehle, a 1994 Indian Bollywood film
"Janam Janam" ("Life after Life"),  a Hindi song from the soundtrack of the 2015 Indian film Dilwale